This is a list of Old Scotch Collegians, who are notable former students  of Scotch College in Melbourne, Victoria, Australia.

Alumni of Scotch College are known as Old Boys or Old Collegians, and automatically become members of the schools alumni association, the Old Scotch Collegians Association (OSCA).

Scotch College has had more alumni mentioned in Who's Who in Australia (a listing of notable Australians) than any other school, and its alumni have received more top (Companion) Order of Australia honours than any other school.    Although knighthoods are no longer bestowed in Australia, at least 71 Scotch College alumni have been knighted.

Viceroys
Sir Zelman Cowen – Governor General of Australia
Peter Hollingworth – Governor General of Australia
Sir Ninian Stephen – Governor General of Australia and Justice of the High Court of Australia
Sir Henry Winneke – Governor of Victoria and Chief Justice of the Supreme Court of Victoria

Academia and science

Eponyms of Universities
Sir John Monash - after whom Monash University is named
Sir Walter Murdoch - after whom Murdoch University is named

Chancellors and Vice-Chancellors
Sir Zelman Cowen – Vice Chancellor of University of New England, Vice-Chancellor of University of Queensland
Peter Darvall – Vice-Chancellor of Monash University
Sir Arthur Dean – Chancellor of the University of Melbourne
Sir David Derham – Vice-Chancellor of the University of Melbourne
Sir Archibald Glenn – Chancellor of La Trobe University
Raymond Martin – Vice-Chancellor of Monash University
Sir John Monash – Vice-Chancellor of University of Melbourne, Monash University named after him
Sir Walter Murdoch – Chancellor and Vice-Chancellor of University of Western Australia, Murdoch University named after him
Sir George Paton – Vice-Chancellor of the University of Melbourne
David Penington – Vice-Chancellor of the University of Melbourne
Ian Renard – Chancellor of the University of Melbourne
Sir Lindsay Ride – Vice Chancellor of the University of Hong Kong
Sir Kenneth Wheare – Vice-Chancellor of Oxford University

Members of the Royal Society
Sir Thomas Cherry
Richard Dalitz
Sir Neil Hamiliton Fairley
Alan Head
Andrew Holmes
John Philip
John Spence

Others – academia and science
 Robert Bartnik – Mathematician
 John Cade – discovered lithium carbonate as a mood stabilizer in the treatment of depression
 Robert Percival Cook FRSE - nutrition expert and Professor of Biochemistry, University of Dundee.
 Rev. Dr Andrew Harper – Biblical scholar and Principal of the Presbyterian Ladies' College, Melbourne and St Andrew's College, Sydney
 Ian Johnston – IVF and reproductive medicine pioneer
 Hugh Gemmell Lamb-Smith — Australian educator who, as a member of the Second Field Ambulance, landed at Anzac Cove on 25 April 1915.
 James P. Leary – Professor of Folklore and Scandinavian Studies University of Wisconsin–Madison
 Noel Lothian - botanist and director of the Adelaide Botanic Garden, from 1948 until 1980, who oversaw the garden's expansion to three sites in South Australia.
 Stuart Macintyre – Dean of Arts at the University of Melbourne, Chair of Australian Studies at Harvard University, voted one of Australia's leading public intellectuals
Sir William Colin Mackenzie -  anatomist, museum administrator - best known for creating Healesville Sanctuary
 Robert Marks – Editor of the Australian Journal of Management, Emeritus Professor at Australian Graduate School of Management
 Dr. E. Neil McQueen – Second Principal of the Presbyterian Ladies' College, Sydney
 Stephen Newton – Principal of Caulfield Grammar School
Sydney Patterson - first Director of WEHI, Australia's oldest medical research institute
 Alan Geoffrey Serle – historian and biographer
 James Simpson – Douglas P. and Katherine B. Loker Professor of English at Harvard University
 Peter Singer – philosopher, Professor of Bioethics at Princeton University, voted one of Australia's leading public intellectuals
 Thomas Gibson Sloane - entomologist 
 Hugh Stretton – Social scientist, voted one of Australia's leading public intellectuals
Sir Sydney Sunderland - scientist and academic in the field of medicine
 George Tait – First Principal of the Presbyterian Ladies' College, Melbourne
 David Vines – Professor of Economics at Oxford University
Sir Ian Wark - chemist and science administrator

Business
Sir James Balderstone – Chairman of BHP and AMP
David Crawford – Chairman Foster's Group and Lendlease
Sir Archibald Glenn – Chairman  of Imperial Chemical Industries Australia
Charles Goode – Chairman of ANZ Bank and Woodside Petroleum
Sir Lenox Hewitt – Chairman of Qantas
Sir Harold Knight – Governor of the Reserve Bank of Australia
Jonathan Ling – CEO of Fletcher Building
Sir Ian McLennan – Chairman of BHP and ANZ Bank
Sir Laurie Muir – stockbroker and director
Lionel Robinson - financier in Australia and England
Hugh Syme - proprietor of The Age newspaper
Robert Somervaille - Chairman of the Australian Broadcasting Corporation, Chairman of the Australian Telecommunications Commission and Overseas Telecommunications Commission, which he merged to become Telstra, founding Director of Hill Samuel Australia Limited which is now Macquarie Group
Evan Thornley – Founder of Looksmart, Chief Executive of Better Place Australia
Sir David Zeidler – Chairman  of Imperial Chemical Industries Australia

Law

Chief justices
Will Alstergren - Chief Justice of the Family Court of Australia
Sir John Latham – Chief Justice of the High Court of Australia, Deputy Prime Minister of Australia
Alastair Nicholson – Chief Justice of the Family Court of Australia
Sir Henry Winneke – Chief Justice of the Supreme Court of Victoria and Governor of Victoria

High Court Justices
Kenneth Hayne – Justice of the High Court of Australia
Sir John Latham – Chief Justice of the High Court of Australia, Deputy Prime Minister of Australia
Sir Hayden Starke – Justice of the High Court of Australia
Sir Ninian Stephen – Justice of the High Court of Australia and Governor General of Australia

Supreme Court Justices
Peter Buchanan - Justice of the Supreme Court of Victoria
Sir Arthur Dean – Justice of the Supreme Court of Victoria and Chancellor of the University of Melbourne
Geoff Digby – Justice of the Supreme Court of Victoria
Greg Garde – Justice of the Supreme Court of Victoria, President of Victorian Civil and Administrative Tribunal
Sir Joseph Hood - Justice of the Supreme Court of Victoria
Stephen Kaye – Justice of the Supreme Court of Victoria
William Kaye – Justice of the Supreme Court of Victoria
Clifford Menhennitt – Justice of the Supreme Court of Victoria, delivered the landmark 1969 Menhennitt ruling which was the first legal precedent with regard to abortion law in Australia
John Phillips – Justice of the Supreme Court of Victoria
Richard Refshauge – Justice of the Supreme Court of the Australian Capital Territory
Sir Henry Winneke – Chief Justice of the Supreme Court of Victoria and Governor of Victoria
John Winneke (son of Sir Henry) – Justice of the Supreme Court of Victoria, President of Victorian Court of Appeal

Media, entertainment, culture and the arts
Graeme Bell – jazz musician
Ric Birch – designer of Olympic Games opening and closing ceremonies
Creighton Burns – editor of The Age newspaper 1981–1989
Richard Davies – actor
John Ewart – AFI award-winning actor
Alexander Frater – writer and chief travel correspondent, the Observer
Sir Roy Grounds – architect, works include National Gallery of Victoria and Victorian Arts Centre
Russel Howcroft - ABC TV panellist, businessman 
Alistair Knox - mudbrick house designer, builder and landscape architect
Mark Kwong – Music Producer and DJ known as Maarcos
Patrick McCaughey – Director of the National Gallery of Victoria
Nick McCallum - television and radio journalist 
Campbell McComas – entertainer, impersonator
Ned Napier – actor
Ian Munro – pianist, composer
Peter Nicholson – cartoonist for The Australian
Chris Pang - actor
Andrew Probyn - journalist
Ron Radford – Director of the National Gallery of Australia
Felix Riebl – lead singer of The Cat Empire
Jesse Spencer – actor 
Walter J. Turner - writer and poet
Chris Wallace-Crabbe – poet, Emeritus Professor in The Australian Centre at the University of Melbourne
John Williamson – country music singer
Michael Wipfli - radio presenter and comedian
Yelian He - cellist

Military and intelligence

Chiefs / Heads of services
Sir Julius Bruche – Chief of the General Staff
Barry Gration – Chief of the Air Staff
Peter Gration – Chief of the Australian Defence Force
Sir Alan McNicholl – Chief of the Royal Australian Navy
Sir John Monash – First Australian overall Commander of the Australian Corps, face on Australian $100 note, Monash University named after him
Paul Symon – Director-General of the Australian Secret Intelligence Service, Deputy Chief of Army

Others – military
Raymond Brownell – Air Commodore, WWI flying ace
Sir Neil Hamiliton Fairley – Brigadier, Director of Medicine, Australian Military Forces during WWII
Greg Garde – Major General, Deputy Chief Australian Defence Force (Reserves) (Australia's highest ranking reservist)
Oliver David Jackson – Commander 1st Australian Task Force in South Vietnam (1966–1967)
Robert Little – top scoring Australian fighter pilot in WWI, killed in action May 1918
Sir James McCay – Lieutenant General
Sir William Refshauge – Major General
Robert Smith – Brigadier General WWI, Commander 5th Brigade
Sir Clive Steele – Major General
Alan Stretton – Major General, Head of National Disaster Organisation, responsible for managing and rebuilding Darwin after Cyclone Tracy
Hugh Randall Syme - Bomb Defuser, grandson of David Syme
Ian Upjohn – Lieutenant Colonel, Commanding Officer of 4th/19th Prince of Wales's Light Horse, commander of Australian troops in Solomon Islands

Politics and public service

Prime ministers and presidents
Sir John Latham – Deputy Prime Minister of Australia
Kalkot Mataskelekele – President of Vanuatu
Sir George Houston Reid – Prime Minister of Australia, Premier of NSW, member of British House of Commons

Premiers
Jim Bacon – Premier of Tasmania
John Cain – Premier of Victoria
Jeff Kennett – Premier of Victoria
Sir Harry Lawson – Premier of Victoria
John MacPherson – Premier of Victoria
Sir George Houston Reid – Premier of NSW
William Shiels – Premier of Victoria
Vaiben Louis Solomon – Premier of South Australia

Cabinet ministers
Bill Baxter – Victorian Nationals Roads & Ports Minister
Sir Gilbert Chandler - Victorian Cabinet Minister
Henry Cohen - Victorian Cabinet Minister
Mark Dreyfus – Federal Attorney General
Andrew Giles - Federal Minister for Immigration, Citizenship, Migrant Services and Multicultural Affairs
Ivor Greenwood – Federal Liberal Minister
Mac Holten – Federal Nationals Minister, Administrator of Christmas Island
Dr David Kemp – Federal Liberal Minister
Rod Kemp – Federal Liberal Minister
Jim Kennan – Victorian Attorney General, Victorian Labor Opposition Leader
Sir James Kennedy - Victorian Cabinet Minister
Sir John Latham – Deputy Prime Minister of Australia, Chief Justice of the High Court of Australia
John Leckie – Federal Minister
Sir James Whiteside McCay – Federal Defence Minister
James McColl – Federal Minister
Andrew Peacock – Federal Liberal Opposition Leader, Ambassador to United States of America
Jim Ramsay - Victorian Cabinet Minister
Andrew Refshauge – Labor Deputy Premier of New South Wales
Sir George Oswald Reid - Victorian Cabinet Minister, Attorney General
Sir Arthur Robinson – Victorian Attorney General
Tony Staley – Federal Liberal Minister, Federal President of the Liberal Party of Australia
Haddon Storey - Victorian Cabinet Minister
George Wise – Federal Minister, Postmaster-General
Michael Wooldridge – Federal Liberal Health Minister

Others – politics and public service
John Arthur Andrews – anarchist theoretician, agitator, poet, journalist
Norman Bayles - Member of Victorian Parliament
Alexander Buchanan – Member of Australian Parliament
James Dunn - Member of Victorian Parliament
James Gibb – Member of Australian Parliament
Robert Bell Hamilton – Renowned Victorian architect, Member for Toorak in Parliament of Victoria and Mornington Shire Council President
Norman Charles Harris – engineer, later lieutenant colonel, Victorian Railways Chairman of Commissioners, honoured by the naming of Melbourne Suburban blue electric 'Harris Train'
Sir Lenox Hewitt – senior public servant
James Gordon Hislop - Member of Western Australian Parliament
Robert Holt - Member of Victorian Parliament, Member of Australian Parliament
Ken Jasper – veteran Nationals member for Murray Valley in Parliament of Victoria
Sir George Knox – Speaker of Victorian Legislative Assembly, City of Knox named after him
William Knox – Federal Member of Parliament, responsible for moving a motion to begin each sitting day of parliament with prayers
Charles Hector McFadyen, Secretary Department of Shipping and Transport 1948-57.
Tich McFarlane - senior positions in the Commonwealth Public Service and statutory bodies
Sir William Refshauge – Director-General of the Commonwealth Department of Health 1960–73
Charles Carty Salmon – Member of Australian Parliament, Speaker of House of Representatives
Sir David Smith – official Secretary to five Australian Governors-General from 1973 to 1990
Sir Keith Waller - public servant and diplomat

Sport

American football
Tom Hackett - punter for the University of Utah Football Team. Is a two time recipient of the Ray Guy Award and member of the Pac-12 All-Century Football Team

Athletics
Craig Hilliard - Head Coach of the Australian Athletics Team
Cameron Mackenzie – Olympic sprinter

Australian rules football
Ed Barlow – Sydney Swans Football Club player
Jack Billings – St. Kilda Football Club player, pick no.3 2013 National NAB AFL Draft
Will Brodie – Gold Coast Football Club and Fremantle Football Club player
Darcy Byrne-Jones – Port Adelaide Football Club player
Campbell Brown – 2008 Premiership player for Hawthorn Football Club. Gold Coast Suns player
Nathan Djerrkura – Geelong Football Club player
Andrew Erickson – Sydney Swans Football Club player
Joel Garner – Port Adelaide Football Club player 
Nick Gill – Adelaide Football Club player
Duncan Harris – Hawthorn FC - 1 game - 1962
Robert Hay – Fitzroy Football Club player
John McKenzie Hay – Collingwood Football Club player
John Hendrie – 1976 & 1978 Premiership Player for Hawthorn Football Club
Doug Heywood – Melbourne Football Club player
Malcolm Hill – Hawthorn FC - 22 games - 1960-1962 including 1961 Premiership
Aidyn Johnson – Port Adelaide Football Club player
Liam Jones – Western Bulldogs Football Club player
Jake Kelly – Adelaide Football Club player
Will Kelly – Collingwood Football Club player
Ian Law – Hawthorn FC - 106 games - 1960-1969 including 1961 Premiership
Jake Long – Essendon Football Club Player
Richard Loveridge – 1983 & 1986 Premiership Player for Hawthorn Football Club
Jamie Macmillan – North Melbourne Football Club player
Finn Maginness – Hawthorn Football Club player
Scott Maginness – 1988 & 1989 Premiership player for Hawthorn Football Club
Will Maginness – West Coast Football Club player
Alex McCracken – Sports administrator, first secretary of the Essendon Football Club and first president of the Victorian Football League.
Bill Morris – Brownlow Medal winner, Richmond Football Club player
Neil Pearson – Hawthorn FC - 133 games - 1945-1954
Michael Perry – Richmond Football Club player
Stan Reid – Fitzroy Football Club player
Cyril Rioli – 2008, 2013, 2014 and 2015 Premiership player for Hawthorn Football Club 
Maurice Rioli Jr - Richmond Football Club player
Michael Rix – St Kilda Football Club player
Jy Simpkin – North Melbourne Football Club player
Ben Sinclair – Collingwood Football Club player
Jack Sinclair – St. Kilda Football club player
Will Slade – Geelong Football Club player
Nick Smith – 2012 Premiership player for Sydney Swans Football Club
James Stewart - Essendon Football Club player
James Strauss – Melbourne Football Club player
Jamarra Ugle-Hagan – Western Bulldogs player
Terry Waites – Collingwood Football Club player
Rupert Wills – Collingwood Football Club player
John Winneke – Hawthorn Football Club - 50 games - 1960-1962 including 1961 Premiership
Colin Youren – Hawthorn FC - 135 games - 1958-1965 including 1961 Premiership

Cricket
George Alexander – Australian cricket team
Andrew Fekete - Victoria cricket team
Colin McDonald – Australian cricket team
Ray Steele – Treasurer of the Australian Cricket Board, President of the Victorian Cricket Association and AFL premiership footballer
Will Sutherland - Victoria cricket team & Vice-Captain of Australia Under-19 cricket team as runners up at the 2018 ICC Under-19 Cricket World Cup

Motorsport
Bib Stillwell - racing driver, won the Australian Drivers' Championship four years consecutively from 1962 to 1965
Bill Patterson - racing driver, won the Australian Grand Prix

Rowing
Josh Booth - Olympic Silver medalist
David Boykett - Olympic Bronze medalist
David Douglas - Olympic Silver medalist
Drew Ginn – three time Olympic Gold medalist
Will Lockwood - two time Olympic Silver medalist
Cameron McKenzie-McHarg – Olympic Silver medalist
Samuel Patten – Olympian and member of the Oarsome Foursome

Rugby
David Fitter – Australian national rugby union team
Brett Gosper - CEO of World Rugby 
Richard Harry - Australian national rugby union team
Ewen McKenzie – head coach of the Australian national rugby union team in which he also played, also head coach of the NSW Waratahs, Stade Français and Queensland Reds

Soccer
Denis Genreau - Australia national soccer team, Melbourne City & PEC Zwolle
James Meredith - Australia national soccer team

Swimming and diving
Dean Pullar – Olympic diving medalist
Matthew Targett – Olympic swimming silver medalist
Matt Welsh – Olympic swimming silver medalist
Rob Woodhouse – Olympic swimming medalist

Tennis
Gerald Patterson – two times Wimbledon singles champion and world number 1 tennis player

See also
 List of schools in Victoria
 List of boarding schools
Associated Public Schools of Victoria

References

External links
 Scotch College, Melbourne website
 Old Scotch Collegians' Association website

Scotch College
Scotch College
Scotch College, Melbourne
Scotch College
 
 List